Fairway may refer to:

Fairway (golf), part of a golf course
Fairway (navigation), a part of a water body with navigable channel
Fairway (horse), a Thoroughbred racehorse
Fairway, Gauteng, South Africa
Fairway, Kansas, United States
Fairway, Lexington, neighborhood in Lexington, Kentucky, United States
Fairway Market, an American grocery chain based mostly in New York City
Fairway Markets, a grocery chain on Vancouver Island in British Columbia, Canada
Fairway, a version of London's Austin FX4 taxicab

See also
Farway, a small village and civil parish in the East Devon district of Devon, England
Fairway Rock, an islet in the Bering Strait
 Faraway (disambiguation)
Fareway, a grocery store chain in Boone, Iowa